Natalie Delamere (born 9 November 1996) is a New Zealand rugby union player. She was a member of the Black Ferns 2021 Rugby World Cup champion squad. She also plays for Matatū in the Super Rugby Aupiki competition.

Rugby career

2014–18 
Delamere made her debut for the Bay of Plenty in the 2014 Farah Palmer Cup season, she was still in her last year at Rotorua Girls' High School. She also played for Waikato from 2016 to 2018.

2022 
Delamere was named in the Matatū squad for the inaugural 2022 Super Rugby Aupiki season. She debuted for the NSW Waratahs in the 2022 Super W season against Fijiana Drua on 1st April. The NSW Waratahs met Fijiana Drua again in the Final where she scored a hat-trick.

Delamere was selected for the Black Ferns squad for the 2022 Pacific Four Series. She made her international test debut on 18 June 2022 against the United States at Whangārei. She was named in the team again for a two-test series against the Wallaroos for the Laurie O'Reilly Cup.

Delamere was selected for the Black Ferns 2021 Rugby World Cup 32-player squad.

References

External links 
 Black Ferns Profile

Living people
1996 births
New Zealand female rugby union players
New Zealand women's international rugby union players
People educated at Rotorua Girls' High School
Rugby union hookers
People from Murupara